Natalya Cherniyenko (born 1 October 1965) is a Ukrainian female former track and field athlete who competed in the javelin throw for the Soviet Union. She was the gold medallist at the 1983 European Athletics Junior Championships. She later represented her country at senior level at the 1990 European Athletics Championships and the 1991 World Championships in Athletics, finishing fourth at the latter event.

International competitions

References

External links

Living people
1965 births
Ukrainian female javelin throwers
Soviet female javelin throwers
World Athletics Championships athletes for the Soviet Union